Treixedo e Nagozela is a civil parish in the municipality of Santa Comba Dão, Portugal. It was formed in 2013 by the merger of the former parishes Treixedo and Nagozela. The population in 2011 was 1,434, in an area of 19.62 km2.

References

Freguesias of Santa Comba Dão